Koster is the Dutch word for sexton or verger (Küster in German), derived from the Latin custos.

Koster is a common surname in the Netherlands, ranking 45th in 2007 (15,898 people). People with the surname "Koster" or "De Koster" include:
 Adam de Koster (1586–1643), Flemish painter
 Adrie Koster (born 1954), Dutch footballer
 Annelise Koster (born 1999), Namibian artistic gymnast
 Anouska Koster (born 1993), Dutch racing cyclist
 Bo Koster (born 1974), American rock musician
 Chava Koster, Dutch rabbi
 Chris Koster (born 1964), American politician from Missouri
 Chris Koster (musician), Canadian singer-songwriter
 Claudia Koster (born 1992), Dutch road cyclist
 Cornelis H. A. Koster (1943–2013), Dutch computer scientist
 Daphne Koster (born 1981), Dutch footballer
 Dominique Koster (born 1977), South African sprinter
 Emma Koster (born 1984), Australian athlete
 Everhardus Koster (1817–1892), Dutch land- and seascape painter
 Fred Koster (1905–1979), American baseball player
 George F. Koster (1927–2012), American physicist a.o. known for the Slater Koster Tight-Binding method
 Hans de Koster (1904–1992), Dutch politician
 Henry Koster (1905–1988), German-born American film director
 Henry Koster (author) (1793–1820), English coffee-grower, explorer, botanist and author
 Irene Koster (1921–2012), Dutch swimmer
 Jan Koster (born 1945), Dutch linguist
 Jans Koster (born 1938), Dutch swimmer
 Jared Koster (born 1991), Canadian football linebacker
 Joëlle Rollo-Koster (born 1960s), French historian
 John Koster (1844–1895), American impresario of the Koster and Bial's Music Hall
 John Koster (born 1951), Washington State politician
 Joséphine Thérèse Koster (1902–1986), botanist
 Julian Koster (born 1972), American musician
 Karen Koster (born 1980), Irish-Dutch television presenter
 Kym Koster (born 1973), Australian rules footballer
 Laure Koster (1902–1999), Luxembourgian swimmer
 Laurens Janszoon Koster ( 1370–1440), Dutch printer
 Lou Koster (1889–1973), Luxembourgian composer and pianist
 Luis Koster (born 1949), Uruguayan basketball player
 Martijn Koster (born  1970), Dutch software engineer
 Martin Koster (born 1950), Dutch writer
 Maureen Koster (born 1992), Dutch middle-distance runner
 Nick Köster (born 1989), South African rugby union player
 R. M. Koster (born 1934), American author
 Raph Koster (born 1971), American computer entrepreneur
 Samuel W. Koster (1919–2006), American army officer
 Sepp Koster (born 1974), Dutch racing driver

See also
 Coster
 Köster
 Koester
 Koster (disambiguation)

References

Dutch-language surnames
Occupational surnames

de:Koster
nl:Koster